Cytotoxicity is the quality of being toxic to cells. Examples of toxic agents are an immune cell or some types of venom, e.g. from the puff adder (Bitis arietans) or brown recluse spider (Loxosceles reclusa).

Cell physiology
Treating cells with the cytotoxic compound can result in a variety of cell fates. The cells may undergo necrosis, in which they lose membrane integrity and die rapidly as a result of cell lysis. The cells can stop actively growing and dividing (a decrease in cell viability), or the cells can activate a genetic program of controlled cell death (apoptosis).

Cells undergoing necrosis typically exhibit rapid swelling, lose membrane integrity, shut down metabolism, and release their contents into the environment. Cells that undergo rapid necrosis in vitro do not have sufficient time or energy to activate apoptotic machinery and will not express apoptotic markers. Apoptosis is characterized by well defined cytological and molecular events including a change in the refractive index of the cell, cytoplasmic shrinkage, nuclear condensation and cleavage of DNA into regularly sized fragments. Cells in culture that are undergoing apoptosis eventually undergo secondary necrosis. They will shut down metabolism, lose membrane integrity and lyse.

Measurement

Cytotoxicity assays are widely used by the pharmaceutical industry to screen for cytotoxicity in compound libraries. Researchers can either look for cytotoxic compounds, if they are interested in developing a therapeutic that targets rapidly dividing cancer cells, for instance; or they can screen "hits" from initial high-throughput drug screens for unwanted cytotoxic effects before investing in their development as a pharmaceutical.

Assessing cell membrane integrity is one of the most common ways to measure cell viability and cytotoxic effects. Compounds that have cytotoxic effects often compromise cell membrane integrity. Vital dyes, such as trypan blue or propidium iodide are normally excluded from the inside of healthy cells; however, if the cell membrane has been compromised, they freely cross the membrane and stain intracellular components. Alternatively, membrane integrity can be assessed by monitoring the passage of substances that are normally sequestered inside cells to the outside. One molecule, lactate dehydrogenase (LDH), is commonly measured using LDH assay. LDH reduces NAD to NADH which elicits a colour change by interaction with a specific probe. Protease biomarkers have been identified that allow researchers to measure relative numbers of live and dead cells within the same cell population. The live-cell protease is only active in cells that have a healthy cell membrane, and loses activity once the cell is compromised and the protease is exposed to the external environment. The dead-cell protease cannot cross the cell membrane, and can only be measured in culture media after cells have lost their membrane integrity.

Cytotoxicity can also be monitored using the 3-(4, 5-Dimethyl-2-thiazolyl)-2, 5-diphenyl-2H-tetrazolium bromide (MTT) or with 2,3-bis-(2-methoxy-4-nitro-5-sulfophenyl)-2H-tetrazolium-5-carboxanilide (XTT), which yields a water-soluble product, or the MTS assay. This assay measures the reducing potential of the cell using a colorimetric reaction. Viable cells will reduce the MTS reagent to a colored formazan product. A similar redox-based assay has also been developed using the fluorescent dye, resazurin. In addition to using dyes to indicate the redox potential of cells in order to monitor their viability, researchers have developed assays that use ATP content as a marker of viability. Such ATP-based assays include bioluminescent assays in which ATP is the limiting reagent for the luciferase reaction.

Cytotoxicity can also be measured by the sulforhodamine B (SRB) assay, WST assay and clonogenic assay.

Suitable assays can be combined and performed sequentially on the same cells in order to reduce assay-specific false positive or false negative results. A possible combination is LDH-XTT-NR (Neutral red assay)-SRB  which is also available in a kit format.

A label-free approach to follow the cytotoxic response of adherent animal cells in real-time is based on electric impedance measurements when the cells are grown on gold-film electrodes. This technology is referred to as electric cell-substrate impedance sensing (ECIS). Label-free real-time techniques provide the kinetics of the cytotoxic response rather than just a snapshot like many colorimetric endpoint assays.

Prediction
A highly important topic is the prediction of cytotoxicity of chemical compounds based on previous measurements, i.e. in-silico testing. For this purpose many QSAR and virtual screening methods have been suggested. An independent comparison of these methods has been done within the "Toxicology in the 21st century" project.

Cancers
Some chemotherapies contain cytotoxic drugs, whose purpose is interfering with the cell division. These drugs cannot distinguish between normal and malignant cells, but they inhibit the overall process of cell division with the purpose to kill the cancers before the hosts.

Immune system 
Antibody-dependent cell-mediated cytotoxicity (ADCC) describes the cell-killing ability of certain lymphocytes, which requires the target cell being marked by an antibody. Lymphocyte-mediated cytotoxicity, on the other hand, does not have to be mediated by antibodies; nor does complement-dependent cytotoxicity (CDC), which is mediated by the complement system.

Three groups of cytotoxic lymphocytes are distinguished:

 Cytotoxic T cells
 Natural killer cells
 Natural killer T cells

See also
 Antireticular Cytotoxic Serum
 Host-pathogen interface
 Membrane vesicle trafficking
 Snake toxins

References

External links
 

Toxicology
Immunology